There have been five baronetcies created for persons with the surname Vavasour, three in the Baronetage of England and two in the Baronetage of the United Kingdom. As of 2008 four of the creations are extinct while one is extant.

The Vavasour Baronetcy, of Hazlewood in the County of York, was created in the Baronetage of England on 24 October 1628 for Thomas Vavasour. (He was the de jure 19th Baron Vavasour but the title had been dormant for centuries since the death of the 2nd Baron.) The title became extinct on the death of the seventh Baronet in 1826.

The Vavasour Baronetcy, of Killingthorpe in the County of Lincoln, was created in the Baronetage of England on 22 June 1631 for Charles Vavasour. The title became extinct on his death in 1644.

The Vavasour Baronetcy, of Copmanthorpe in the County of York, was created in the Baronetage of England on 17 July 1643 for William Vavasour, brother of Charles abovementioned. The title became extinct on his death in 1659.

The Vavasour Baronetcy, of Spaldington in the County of York, was created in the Baronetage of the United Kingdom on 20 March 1801 for Henry Vavasour. The title became extinct on the death of the third Baronet in 1912.

The Vavasour Baronetcy, of Hazlewood in the County of York, was created in the Baronetage of the United Kingdom on 14 February 1828 for Edward Vavasour. He was the third son of Charles Stourton, 17th Baron Stourton (see Baron Stourton for earlier history of the family), and the maternal cousin of the seventh and last Vavasour Baronet of the 1628 creation. He succeeded to the Vavasour estates and assumed by Royal licence the surname of Vavasour.

Vavasour baronets, of Hazlewood (1628) 
1st creation

Sir Thomas Vavasour, 1st Baronet (died before 1636)
Sir Walter Vavasour, 2nd Baronet (died after 1666)
Sir Walter Vavasour, 3rd Baronet ( – 1713)
Sir Walter Vavasour, 4th Baronet (c. 1659 – 1740)
Sir Walter Vavasour, 5th Baronet (died 1766)
Sir Walter Vavasour, 6th Baronet (1744–1802)
Sir Thomas Vavasour, 7th Baronet (c. 1745 – 1826)

Vavasour baronets, of Killingthorpe (1631) 

Sir Charles Vavasour, 1st Baronet (died 1644)

Vavasour baronets, of Copmanthorpe (1643) 

Sir William Vavasour, 1st Baronet (died 1659)

Vavasour baronets, of Spaldington (1801) 

Sir Henry Vavasour, 1st Baronet (died 1813)
Sir Henry Maghull Mervin Vavasour, 2nd Baronet (1768–1838)
Sir Henry Mervin Vavasour, 3rd Baronet (1814–1912)

Vavasour baronets, of Hazlewood (1828) 

Second creation
Sir Edward Marmaduke Stourton Vavasour, 1st Baronet (1786–1847)
Sir Edward Marmaduke Vavasour, 2nd Baronet (1815–1885)
Sir William Edward Joseph Vavasour, 3rd Baronet (1846–1915)
Sir Leonard Pius Vavasour, 4th Baronet (1881–1961)
Sir Geoffrey William Vavasour, 5th Baronet (1914–1997)
Sir Eric Michel Joseph Marmaduke Vavasour, 6th Baronet (born 1953)

The heir apparent to the baronetcy is Joseph Ian Hugh Andre Vavasour (born 1978), eldest son of the 6th Baronet.

Citations and sources

Citations

Sources 

 – 1625 to 1649

1628 establishments in England
Baronetcies in the Baronetage of the United Kingdom
Extinct baronetcies in the Baronetage of England
Extinct baronetcies in the Baronetage of the United Kingdom